Concordian International School is a Pre-K to grade 12 school located in Bang Phli District, Samut Prakan, Thailand. The school educates about 1100 students within the International Baccalaureate Organization programs. It is a trilingual international school in Thailand running the International Baccalaureate program. Concordian International School offers full immersion in English, Chinese and Thai from Pre-K until Grade 4, then a full English immersion program with Chinese and Thai as additional languages from Grade 5 to Grade 12.

Concordian International is a private school, and a member of International Schools Association of Thailand. It is accredited by the International Baccalaureate Organization the New England Association of Schools and Colleges (NEASC), the Council of International Schools (CIS), and the Thai Ministry of Education.

History
Concordian International School (Concordian) was founded in August 2001 by school sponsor Varnnee Chearavanont Ross, who is part of the Chearavanont family.  Concordian moved from its old campus in Thana City, Thailand in 2006 to the new campus at Bangkaew, Bangna-Trad km7 in the Greater Bangkok province of Samut Prakan.

The school’s name is taken from the Old French concorde and from the Latin concordia, meaning “agreement” or “union”, and also from con, meaning together, and cor meaning heart: literally, "hearts together",

Curriculum
Concordian International School offers the full range of International Baccalaureate Organization programmes, including:
 the Primary Years Programme (PYP), 
 the Middle Years Programme (MYP), and 
 the Diploma Programme (DP).

Clubs & Activities
The school offers the following clubs and activities to students:

Sports

Concordian International School belongs to two sport league: TISAC and AISAA. Concordian students compete regularly in multiple sports, starting in under 9 all the way to senior level in soccer, basketball, swimming, golf, table tennis, badminton, and tennis competitively against other schools.

Concordian has invested more than 400 million baht in extra facilities, including a second swimming pool (50-meter covered swimming pool), 2 extra gymnasium, 2 new tennis court, 4 squash courts, dance studios, and more.

Faculty
Founding Director - K. Varnnee Chearavanont Ross
Head of School / CEO - Mr. Laurent Goetschmann
Elementary Principal - Ms. Ariel Wang
Elementary Principal - Mr. Tim Byrum
Secondary Principal - Mr. William Berry
Secondary Principal - Ms. Sally Wen
Secondary Principal - Ms. Min Li

Concordian International School has 240 full-time teachers, all fully qualified teachers coming from the United States, Canada, Australia, England and for our Chinese section from China and Taiwan.

Mascot

There are three Mascots for Concordian International School - all of them are Dragons.

Accreditation
 Council of International Schools
 International Baccalaureate Organization
 New England Association of Schools and Colleges
 International Schools Association of Thailand

References

Charoen Pokphand
Educational institutions established in 2001
International schools in Thailand
International Baccalaureate schools in Thailand
Private schools in Thailand
2001 establishments in Thailand
International schools in the Bangkok Metropolitan Region